Yot Sangthien (born 19 January 1938) is a Thai boxer. He competed in the men's light middleweight event at the 1964 Summer Olympics. At the 1964 Summer Olympics, he lost to Tolman Gibson of the United States.

References

1938 births
Living people
Yot Sangthien
Yot Sangthien
Boxers at the 1964 Summer Olympics
Place of birth missing (living people)
Light-middleweight boxers